This is a list of notable people from the British Virgin Islands

Politicians

John Charles Brudenell-Bruce, MBE, OStJ
Alvin Christopher
Ivan Dawson
Isaac Glanville Fonseca
Andrew Fahie
Julian Fraser
Omar Hodge
Terrance B. Lettsome
Conrad Maduro
Ralph T. O'Neal, OBE
Qwominer William Osborne
Eileen Parsons
Dancia Penn
Howard Reynold Penn, MBE
Cyril Romney
Ethlyn Smith
Orlando Smith, OBE
H. Lavity Stoutt
Willard Wheatley

Authors, writers and poets
Richard Georges
Jennie Wheatley

Sports People

 J'maal Alexander
 Matthew Arneborg
 Steve Augustine
 Keita Cline
 Dion Crabbe
 Peter Crook
 Erroll Fraser
 Dean Greenaway
 Tahesia Harrigan
 Eldred Henry
 Guy Hill
 Lindel Hodge
 Ashley Kelly (athlete)
 Chantel Malone
 Eric Matthias
 Kyron McMaster
 Jerry Molyneaux
 Elinah Phillip
 Greg Rhymer
 Karl Scatliffe
 John Shirley (sailor)
 Keith Thomas (sailor)
 Robin Tattersall
 Willis Todman
 Mario Todman
 Ralston Varlack

Military

 Samuel Hodge, VC
 Tony Snell (RAF officer), DSO

Other public figures

Melanie Amaro
Inez Archibald
Joseph Archibald, QC
Iyaz
Dancia Penn, QC (also served as a politician representing the VIP in 8th district)
Michael Riegels, QC

Famous residents

Sir Richard Branson
Morgan Freeman
Henry Jarecki
Peter Jennings
Larry Page
Curt Richardson
Daniel Wildenstein

Historical figures

"Black" Samuel Bellamy (pirate)
Joost van Dyk (privateer)
Arthur William Hodge (murderer)
John C. Lettsome (physician)
Samuel Nottingham (philanthropist)
William Thornton (architect)

 British Virgin Islanders